= The World's Youngest Nation: South Sudan =

2012 South Sudanese documentary film

- Directed by: Matthew LeRiche; Viktor Pesenti
- Story by: Matthew LeRiche; Viktor Pesenti
- Production companies: Bruce Dunlop & Associates (BDA); EpicDemic Productions; Expeditionary Productions
- Release date: 28 April 2012; (USA)
- Running time: 51 minutes
- Countries: United States; United Kingdom; South Sudan
- Language: English

The World's Youngest Nation: South Sudan, is a 2012 South Sudanese documentary news post-war film co-directed by Matthew LeRiche and Viktor Pesenti and co-produced by Bruce Dunlop & Associates (BDA), EpicDemic Productions and Expeditionary Productions. The film documents about the emergence of a new nation from civil war, South Sudan after 60 years of civil war from Sudan on July 9, 2011. South Sudan is often named as The World's Youngest Nation, where the 70 percent of the population are under 30 years of age. The film narrates with the experiences and hopes of five Southern Sudanese youths.

The film has been shot in South Sudan. The film made its premier on 28 April 2012 in the United States. The film received mixed reviews from critics. The film was screened at the Africa World Documentary Film Festival in London, England, from 30 August to 9 September 2012. Then the film was aired across Africa via a satellite channel.
